The 2022 Long Beach State Beach men's volleyball team represents Long Beach State University in the 2022 NCAA Division I & II men's volleyball season. The Beach, led by nineteenth year head coach Alan Knipe, play their home games at Walter Pyramid. The Beach compete as members of the Big West Conference and were picked as co-champions in the Big West preseason poll.

Roster

Schedule
TV/Internet Streaming/Radio information:
22 West Media will carry select Long Beach State men's volleyball matches on the radio.
ESPN+ will carry all home and conference road games. All other road broadcasts will be carried by the schools respective streaming partner. 

 *-Indicates conference match.
 Times listed are Pacific Time Zone.

Rankings 

^The Media did not release a Pre-season poll.

References

2022 in sports in California
2022 NCAA Division I & II men's volleyball season
2022 team
Long Beach State